Michel Angers is a local politician in Shawinigan, Quebec. He is the current Mayor of the city, having won the 2009 municipal election.

Background

He was born on November 2, 1959  and is from the Grand-Mère section of town.

Angers has worked for Alcan.  He has a background in organized labour, serving in a leadership position with the local branch of the CSN.

Mayor of Shawinigan

Angers became a candidate for Mayor of Shawinigan in May 2009.  He did not run as part of a ticket and expressed the desire to work with whoever the voters would send to city hall.  His campaign used the Internet, as the other candidates did.  Angers pledged to help creating jobs and proposed the replacement of slums with newer housing or businesses.  His opponents accused him of being politically too close to incumbent Lise Landry who supported him.

Picking up key endorsements from local politicians such as Mayor André Garant of Saint-Élie-de-Caxton and former city councillor Maurice Héroux, Angers won the election with 55% of the vote against former PQ provincial cabinet member Yves Duhaime (29%) and Ralliement municipal candidate Claude Villemure (16%).

Footnotes

1959 births
Trade unionists from Quebec
Living people
Mayors of Shawinigan